The Jubilee Bridge is a road and pedestrian/cycle bridge carrying the Queen Elizabeth Way north-south across the River Tees in the borough of Stockton-on-Tees, northern England. It links Preston-on-Tees with Ingleby Barwick.
The bridge is over  upriver from, and over  approximately south of Stockton town centre.

Design 

The Jubilee Bridge is a balanced cantilever design, 150 m long with 3 spans and a main span of 106 m.
It is constructed from reinforced concrete and T-section steel plate girders.
It carries dual two lane carriageways and additionally on the western side, a pedestrian cycle track linking in to the local pedestrian cycle tracks on the southern bank of the River Tees.

The piers are supported on 914 mm concrete-filled tubular steel piles and the abutments are supported by steel 'H' piles.

Construction 

The bridge was built by Birse Construction Ltd with steel fabrication supplied by Cleveland Bridge & Engineering Company of Darlington.

Operation 

The bridge was opened on 20 April 2002.

References

External links 

 Jubilee Bridge on the Bridges on the Tyne website
 Jubilee Bridge at Structurae.
 Leaflet: tourismleafletsonline.com.

Crossings of the River Tees
Bridges completed in 2002
Bridges in County Durham
Bridges in North Yorkshire
Buildings and structures in Stockton-on-Tees
2002 establishments in England